The Yarmouth Vanguard was a weekly community newspaper published in Yarmouth, Nova Scotia. Established in 1966, it served Yarmouth County and was owned by TC Transcontinental. It was rebranded from the Yarmouth Vanguard to the Yarmouth County Vanguard. In January 2016, it was merged with two other weekly newspapers, the Digby Courier and the Shelburne Coast Guard,  to form the Tri-County Vanguard. The last issue of the Yarmouth County Vanguard was published on January 26, 2016.

References

External links
 Official website

Yarmouth County
Weekly newspapers published in Nova Scotia
Publications established in 1966
Publications disestablished in 2016
1966 establishments in Nova Scotia
2016 disestablishments in Nova Scotia